Live from Faraway Stables is a 2003 live album and concert film by Australian alternative rock band Silverchair. It was recorded at their concert held on 19 April 2003, at Newcastle Civic Theatre in the band's home-town of Newcastle, New South Wales,  and was the second show to be held  during the band's Across the Night world tour of March to June  It is Silverchair's first live 

On all shows of the Across the Night tour, the concert was divided into two  which were introduced on the three large video screens above the stage as "Act 1" and "Act 2"; the respective CDs and DVDs in the album are labelled in the same  "Act 1", which showcased mainly quieter and more experimental  was "dominated" by songs from the band's then-latest studio album, Diorama, and was marked by "grand orchestrated sections (replicated by two extra keyboards); dramatic flourishes, both vocally and instrumentally; [and] an almost parodic leap into prog rock's 'look at me, look at me' shifts of form and  "Act 2", which consisted of heavier rock  saw the band "revert to more of a hard rock set-up, with the cabaret touches junked for less subtle, but brutally effective 

The album spent three weeks on the Australian ARIA Charts, peaking at  It has been certified gold by the Australian Recording Industry Association. The original two-CD/two-DVD release was made available in both CD-sized and DVD-sized packaging.

Track listing
The concert footage of songs listed on the audio CDs (Discs 1 and 2) appear on their corresponding DVDs (Discs 3 and 4). All songs were written by Daniel Johns, except for the "Overture" from "Act 2", which was written by

"Act 1" – Disc 1 (audio CD)/Disc 3 (DVD)
 "Overture" – 1:32
 "After All These Years" – 4:33
 "World Upon Your Shoulders" – 5:14
 "Tuna in the Brine" – 5:27
 "Luv Your Life" – 4:44
 "Paint Pastel Princess" – 4:36
 "Petrol & Chlorine" – 5:07
 "Across the Night" – 5:25
 "Ana's Song (Open Fire)" – 4:33
 "Miss You Love" – 4:10
 "Steam Will Rise" – 9:26

"Act 2" – Disc 2 (audio CD)/Disc 4 (DVD)
 "Overture" – 0:55
 "Emotion Sickness" – 9:30
 "Without You" – 4:11
 "Israel's Son" – 7:32
 "Black Tangled Heart" – 4:25
 "Do You Feel the Same?" – 4:32
 "The Greatest View" – 5:08
 "The Door" – 5:45
 "Freak" – 5:12
 "Anthem for the Year 2000" – 6:01
 "One Way Mule" – 6:21
 "Asylum" – 5:22
 "The Lever" – 13:43

Bonus material (DVD)
"Emotion Sickness" (Live in Sao Paulo)
An Insight into Production
Behind the scenes
Photo gallery
Sound Dolby Digital 5.1

Personnel
Daniel Johns – guitar, piano, vocals
Chris Joannou – bass guitar
Ben Gillies – drums
Julian Hamilton – keyboard, backing vocals
Stuart Hunter – keyboard, backing vocals
Nick Launay – mixing
David Davis – assistant mix engineering
Chris Thompson – live recording engineering
Steven Schram – live recording assistant engineering
Don Bartley – mastering
Andrew Lord – television director
Ben Richardson – executive producer

Release history

Certification

References

Silverchair video albums
2003 live albums
2003 video albums
Live video albums
Silverchair albums